Maulana Mohammad Ali College is a state college in Kagmari, Tangail, Bangladesh. It is often referred to as M. M. Ali College. The college is located at Kagmari near Tangail city. This is a government college affiliated with National University of Bangladesh. Professor Md. Shahiduzzaman Mian is the principal of the college.

History
Maulana Mohammad Ali College was established in 1957 by Maulana Abdul Hamid Khan Bhasani and was named after Mohammad Ali Jouhar, an important leader of the Khilafat movement of British India. The school was initially located at an used government office. In 1958, in the aftermath of the Bengali language movement, a martyr's memorial was erected on campus. During the 1969 East Pakistan mass uprising one student was killed and ten were injured on 4 February when the East Pakistan Rifles opened fire on a demonstration. During the Bangladesh Liberation war, a former professor of the college, Abdul Khaleque, was in the local pro-Pakistan militia, the Razakars. He is responsible for war crimes and forcibly converting Hindus into Muslims. 

In 1975 the government of Bangladesh nationalised the college.

Notable people
 Rafiq Azad began his career teaching Bengali at the college from 1968 to 1972

References

Schools in Tangail District
Colleges in Tangail District
Education in Tangail
1957 establishments in East Pakistan